The Liffey Service Tunnel is a service tunnel for various pipelines in Dublin, Ireland, owned by Dublin City Council.

Project
The tunnel was designed by British company Atkins and constructed by a joint venture of the German contractor Züblin and the Irish contractor Cleary & Doyle of Wexford. Its construction took place from September 2006 until October 2008.

Tunnel design
The tunnel is 260 metres long and consists of a single bore of diameter 2.96 metres. It was built in pipe-jacking using a Herrenknecht tunnel-boring machine and 2.5-metre-long precast reinforced-concrete pipes. The tunnel leads from the southern edge of the East Link Bridge, underneath the River Liffey towards the North Quay Wall, approximately 150 metres west of 3Arena. The drive and reception shafts are respectively 19 m and 22 m deep, leaving the tunnel passing approximately 8 m below the shipping channel of the river.

References

External links
 Project manager's page

Tunnels in the Republic of Ireland
Tunnels completed in 2008